Ali Traoré (born February 28, 1985) is an Ivorian-born French former professional basketball player. He also represented the France national basketball team internationally.

Professional career 
Traoré made his professional debut with ASVEL Basket during the 2001–02 season. In the 2004–05 season he played college basketball at the College of Southern Idaho. In February 2005, he returned to France and signed with UJAP Quimper 29 for the rest of the season. For the 2005–06 season he signed with Chorale Roanne. From 2006 to 2008 he played with STB Le Havre.

On June 28, 2008, he signed a one-year deal with ASVEL Basket. On June 30, 2009, he re-signed with ASVEL. On July 22, 2010, he signed a two-year contract with Italian club Virtus Roma. He left Roma after one season. On August 1, 2011, Traore signed a two-year contract with Russian club Lokomotiv Kuban. On December 10, 2012, he parted ways with Lokomotiv.

On December 27, 2012, he signed with Serbian club KK Crvena zvezda. However, he left the club on February 6, 2013, due to a knee injury. On February 18, 2013, he signed with German club Alba Berlin for the rest of the season. On September 24, 2013, he signed with JSF Nanterre. On December 22, 2013, he parted ways with Nanterre. On February 19, 2014, he signed with Amchit Club of Lebanon for the rest of the season.

On July 24, 2014, Traore signed a one-year deal with Strasbourg IG. On July 8, 2015, he signed a one-year deal with Limoges CSP.

On August 3, 2016, Traore signed with Spanish club Estudiantes. On January 26, 2017, he parted ways with Estudiantes. On March 14, 2017, he signed with Byblos Club of Lebanon.

On November 22, 2017, Traore signed with Antibes Sharks. On January 3, 2018, he moved to AS Monaco for the rest of the 2017–18 Pro A season. Traore joined Strasbourg IG in 2018. He averaged 11.3 points, 3.7 rebounds and 1.2 assists per game during the 2019–20 season. He rejoined Antibes Sharks on September 10, 2020.

On March 1, 2022, he has announced his retirement from professional basketball.

National team career
As a member of the senior French national team he won the silver medal at the 2011 EuroBasket in Lithuania.

References

External links
 
 
 Ali Traoré at draftexpress.com
 Ali Traoré at eurobasket.com
 Ali Traoré at fiba.com
 Ali Traoré at lnb.fr
 

1985 births
Living people
2010 FIBA World Championship players
Alba Berlin players
AS Monaco Basket players
ASVEL Basket players
Basketball players at the 2012 Summer Olympics
Black French sportspeople
CB Estudiantes players
Centers (basketball)
Chorale Roanne Basket players
French expatriate basketball people in Spain
French expatriate basketball people in the United States
French expatriate sportspeople in Monaco
French men's basketball players
French sportspeople of Ivorian descent
Ivorian emigrants to France
Liga ACB players
Limoges CSP players
Nanterre 92 players
Olympic basketball players of France
Olympique Antibes basketball players
Pallacanestro Virtus Roma players
PBC Lokomotiv-Kuban players
SIG Basket players
Southern Idaho Golden Eagles men's basketball players
Sportspeople from Abidjan
STB Le Havre players
UJAP Quimper 29 players